Javorius Tykies Scott (July 15, 1998 – July 27, 2022), known professionally as JayDaYoungan, was an American rapper and singer. He was best known for his singles "23 Island", "Elimination", and "Opps", which have received 73, 35, and 40 million respective streams on SoundCloud as of November 2022. Scott released the mixtapes Forever 23 (2018), Endless Pain (2019), and his debut commercial mixtape Misunderstood (2019), which peaked at number 43 on the US Billboard 200. His debut studio album, Baby23, was released on June 5, 2020. He was first exposed to the mainstream with his mixtapes Ruffwayy and The Real Jumpman 23, which included the tracks "Sliding Freestyle" and "Muddy Situation".

Early life 
Scott was born on July 15, 1998, in Bogalusa, Louisiana. He began his rapping career at the age of 18 and dropped out of high school to pursue his career.

Career

2017–2018: Beginnings, "Interstate", and Forever 23 
In February 2017 Scott released his mixtape Ruffwayy, which became a regional success and gave him local recognition; his song "Interstate" broke 4 million views on YouTube in under a month. He was then considered for a spot on the XXL freshman list in 2018, a list of up-and-coming rappers.

After the project Scott released the mixtape The Real Jumpman 23, which had 13 tracks totaling 32 minutes, including the songs "Sliding Freestyle" and "Muddy Situation". He then released mixtapes Wake Up and Taking Off, the latter of which featured rappers FG Famous and NBA 3Three.

His first nationwide hit came with the song "Elimination" on the mixtape 23, which has over 62.8 million streams on Spotify as of November 2022. He was interviewed by the lyric company Genius to break down the meaning of the song. The mixtape had 10 tracks at 28 minutes with no features. Then he released the mixtape Forever 23, including the tracks "Thot Thot" and "Purge", which have garnered 43.9 and 22 million streams respectively on Spotify and helped push him into international recognition. The critic site AllMusic rated the mixtape 3.5/5 stars, and despite it having no features, the mixtape reached number 86 on the Billboard 200 becoming his first entry on that chart. It also hit number 37 on the Top R&B/Hip-Hop Albums.

2019–2022: Endless Pain, "23 Island", Misunderstood  and 23 Is Back 
Following this, JayDaYoungan released the mixtape Endless Pain, which became known for the tracks "Repo" and "War Ready" which stand at 6.5 and 4 million streams respectively on SoundCloud as of January 5, 2020. The album peaked at number 70 and number 37 on Billboard 200 and the Top R&B/Hip-Hop albums, respectively. He and rapper Yungeen Ace then released the collaborative mixtape Can't Speak On It, which included the songs "Opps" and "Creep Behind". He then released another mixtape titled Misunderstood, which included the single "23 Island", which garnered 17.8 million streams on Spotify as of January 5, 2020, and reached number 9 of the Bubbling Under R&B/Hip-Hop Chart. The mixtape had features from YFN Lucci, Boosie Badazz, FG Famous, JetSoo, and Lil Durk. Durk remixed the track "Dum" which was featured on the mixtape Endless Pain. It featured 19 tracks at 53 minutes, and charted on the Billboard 200, peaking at number 43. JayDaYoungan and rapper Yung Bans had an online feud over the title of the album, as Bans released his debut album earlier in the year, also titled Misunderstood.

On January 3, 2020, Jay reached number 36 on the Billboard Emerging Artists Chart.

In May 2020, JayDaYoungan released "Touch Your Toes" featuring rapper Mulatto (now known as Latto), as a single from his debut album Baby23, which was released on June 5, 2020, and named after his first child who was also born the same night. The album included the singles "23 Island", "Perky Activated" and "38k", and featured Dej Loaf, Moneybagg Yo, and Kevin Gates.

On June 11, 2021, Jay released the album, 23 Is Back, a 13-track project which has no features.

Musical style 
Scott stated he grew up listening to Kevin Gates, Boosie Badazz, and Chief Keef. Musically his flow and style has been compared to Boosie and Youngboy Never Broke Again. He said, "[I] don't see me sounding similar to nobody else", and that he is not trying to imitate anybody else. He was noted for a style similar to that of Lil Wayne and Kevin Gates by critic Fred Thomas.

Scott spoke of his goals: "Later on in my career, when I get to a certain point, I will be signing artists, starting my own label. Just perfecting my craft each and every day."

Legal issues 
On May 11, 2019, Scott was charged with felony possession of a controlled substance without a prescription after being pulled over by Florida Highway Patrol in Gadsden County, Florida. When pulled over, police officers found 20 grams of weed, drug paraphernalia, and oxycodone pills. Someone who was riding with him was also found to be in possession of a firearm. The people riding with him were given various other charges relating to the drugs and firearm. On May 12, Scott was released on a $2,500 bail. Scott was scheduled to perform at the Rolling Loud Music Festival and was unable to due to his arrest. 

In March 2020, he assaulted a pregnant woman, police raided Scott's house, seizing $24,000 in cash, promethazine, oxycodone, and multiple firearms. Police arrested Scott after he was allegedly "found hiding in an attic." Scott was charged with assaulting a pregnant woman and illegal drug possession, with bail set at $20,000. Another man who was at his house, Kardell Robertson, was arrested for unlawful possession of a firearm and granted a $100 bail.

On September 16, 2021, Scott was arrested on charges of accessory to second-degree murder and obstruction of justice, stemming from a fatal shooting that occurred in August 2020. Four days later, Scott was released on a $175,000 bond.

On October 30, 2021, Scott was arrested during a traffic stop in Washington Parish, Louisiana on multiple charges including child desertion, driving without proof of insurance, drug possession, and evidence tampering. On November 4, 2021, Scott was released from jail on bond.

On November 4, 2021—hours after posting bond in his Washington Parish case—Scott was arrested by Bureau of Alcohol, Tobacco, Firearms, and Explosives agents on federal charges.

On June 16, 2022, Scott pleaded guilty to possession of a firearm while under indictment or felony charges and was sentenced to time served, as well as one year of supervised release. He was also fined $5,500 and a $100 mandatory special assessment fee.

Death 
On July 27, 2022, Scott and his father, Kenyatta Scott were sitting in the front lawn of their Bogalusa home when a black truck arrived, and three armed gunmen got out. Scott and his father tried running inside the home, but two additional gunmen came from the side of the house and opened fire. Scott Sr. produced his own firearm and shot back in self-defense. Scott was shot at least eight times and died at a local Bogalusa hospital not too far from the scene of the shooting. Scott Sr. was shot twice in the arm and was in stable condition.

Funeral 
On August 7, 2022, Scott was laid to rest. His funeral was held in the auditorium of his former high school in Bogalusa.
Among those in attendance were notable artists Boosie Badazz and Yungeen Ace.

Discography

Studio albums

Posthumous albums

EPs

Mixtapes

Singles

See also 
 List of murdered hip hop musicians

References 

1998 births
2022 deaths
Rappers from Louisiana
African-American male rappers
21st-century American rappers
People from Bogalusa, Louisiana
21st-century American male musicians
21st-century African-American musicians
People murdered in Louisiana